Mendaza is a town and municipality located in the province and autonomous community of Navarre, northern Spain.  The Battle of Mendaza took place here in 1834.

References

External links
 MENDAZA in the Bernardo Estornés Lasa - Auñamendi Encyclopedia (Euskomedia Fundazioa) 

Municipalities in Navarre